Archibald Ross Lewis (August 25, 1914 – February 4, 1990) was an American historian, World War II Veteran, professor, and author. He wrote 14 books, and more than 100 articles. As a professor he taught at the University of South Carolina, University of Texas, and University of Massachusetts, in that order.

Biography

Early life and military service
Archibald Ross Lewis was born on August 25, 1914, in Bronxville, New York. He enrolled at Princeton, where he earned his bachelor's degree (1936), Master's Degree (1939), and Doctoral Degree (1940). Lewis served for 5 years in World War Two, working in field artillery. He retired as a lieutenant colonel. During the War he was awarded a Croix de Guerre, a bronze star, and five battle stars. Most of what we know about his military service comes from his book, War in The West, which he wrote shortly before he died of a heart attack in 1990. The book itself was not published until 1992.

Time as a professor
Lewis first served at the University of South Carolina. Afterwards he was a professor at University of Texas for 16 years, and then University of Massachusetts for another 16 years.

Works
 Nomads and Crusaders, A.D. 1000–1368
 European Naval and Maritime History, 300–1500
 Development of Southern French and Catalan Society, 718–1050
 Emerging Medieval Europe, A.D. 400–1000
 Knights and Samurai
 Aspects of the Renaissance

Notes

References 
 Obituary (1990). "Archibald Ross Lewis '39," Princeton Alumni Weekly <http://paw.princeton.edu>.
 Obituary (1990). "Archibald Ross Lewis, Historian, Dies at 75," The New York Times, <https://www.nytimes.com>.
 Durbin, John R. (2001). "In Memoriam, Archibald Ross Lewis," University of Texas (1305).
 Lewis, Archibald (1992). "War in the West." .

1990 deaths
1914 births
20th-century American historians
American male non-fiction writers
Fellows of the Medieval Academy of America
20th-century American male writers
People from Bronxville, New York